In mathematics, Stone's theorem on one-parameter unitary groups is a basic theorem of functional analysis that establishes a one-to-one correspondence between self-adjoint operators on a Hilbert space  and one-parameter families

of unitary operators that are strongly continuous, i.e.,

and are homomorphisms, i.e.,

Such one-parameter families are ordinarily referred to as strongly continuous one-parameter unitary groups.

This is an impressive result, as it allows one to define the derivative of the  mapping  which is only supposed to be  continuous. It is also related to the theory of Lie groups and Lie algebras.

Formal statement 
The statement of the theorem is as follows. 

Theorem. Let  be a strongly continuous one-parameter unitary group.
 

Conversely, let  be a (possibly unbounded) self-adjoint operator on  Then the one-parameter family  of unitary operators defined by 

is a strongly continuous one-parameter group.

In both parts of the theorem, the expression  is defined by means of the spectral theorem for unbounded self-adjoint operators.

The operator  is called the infinitesimal generator of  Furthermore,  will be a bounded operator if and only if the operator-valued mapping  is norm-continuous.

The infinitesimal generator  of a strongly continuous unitary group  may be computed as

with the domain of  consisting of those vectors  for which the limit exists in the norm topology. Part of the statement of the theorem is that this derivative exists—i.e., that  is a densely defined self-adjoint operator. The result is not obvious even in the finite-dimensional case, since  is only assumed (ahead of time) to be continuous, and not differentiable.

Example 

The family of translation operators

is a one-parameter unitary group of unitary operators; the infinitesimal generator of this family is an extension of the differential operator

defined on the space of continuously differentiable complex-valued functions with compact support on  Thus

In other words, motion on the line is generated by the momentum operator.

Applications 

Stone's theorem has numerous applications in quantum mechanics. The infinitesimal generator of this group is the system Hamiltonian.

Using Fourier transform

Stone's Theorem can be recast using the language of the Fourier transform. The real line  is a locally compact abelian group. Non-degenerate *-representations of the group C*-algebra  are in one-to-one correspondence with strongly continuous unitary representations of  i.e., strongly continuous one-parameter unitary groups. Hence, there is a one-to-one correspondence between strongly continuous one-parameter unitary groups and *-representations of  As every *-representation of  corresponds uniquely to a self-adjoint operator, Stone's Theorem holds.

Therefore, the procedure for obtaining the infinitesimal generator of a strongly continuous one-parameter unitary group is as follows:

 By the Riesz-Markov Theorem,  gives rise to a projection-valued measure on  that is the resolution of the identity of a unique self-adjoint operator , which may be unbounded.
 Then  is the infinitesimal generator of 

It is a non-trivial fact that, via the Fourier transform,  is isomorphic to  A result in this direction is the Riemann-Lebesgue Lemma, which says that the Fourier transform maps  to

Generalizations 

The Stone–von Neumann theorem generalizes Stone's theorem to a pair of self-adjoint operators, satisfying the canonical commutation relation, and shows that these are all unitarily equivalent to the position operator and momentum operator on 

The Hille–Yosida theorem generalizes Stone's theorem to strongly continuous one-parameter semigroups of contractions on Banach spaces.

References

Bibliography

 K. Yosida, Functional Analysis, Springer-Verlag, (1968)

Theorems in functional analysis